The Pakistan Judo Federation (PJF) is the governing body to develop and promote the game of Judo in the Pakistan. The federation is based in Peshawar.

In the beginning, Judo and Karate games were being played together under the supervision of Pakistan Judo Karate Board. In 1988, Judo was separated from Karate and a separate body for Judo was established as Pakistan Judo Federation, and Pakistan Karate Federation overtook responsibilities of Karate.

Affiliations
The federation is member of International Judo Federation and Judo Union of Asia (JUA). It is also member of Pakistan Sports Board
and Pakistan Olympic Association.

References

External links
 Official website

National members of the International Judo Federation
Sports governing bodies in Pakistan
1988 establishments in Pakistan
Sports organizations established in 1988